The Fuente del Ángel Caído (Fountain of the Fallen Angel or Monument of the Fallen Angel) is a fountain located in the Buen Retiro Park in Madrid, Spain. 

The statue that crowns the monument is the masterpiece of Ricardo Bellver who realized it in plaster in 1877 while a 3rd year pensioner in Rome, inspired by verses from Paradise Lost of John Milton (Canto I). He submitted it to the 1877 edition of the Exposiciones Nacionales de Bellas Artes where it received the first prize. The state acquired the work and presented it to the 1878 Exposition Universelle. Since only works in marble and bronze were accepted, the statue was cast in bronze at this occasion and the plaster original destroyed.

The statue returned to Spain in what was then the Museo Nacional de Pintura y Escultura (also known as the Museo de la Trinidad, now part of the Museo del Prado). The director of the museum, Benito Soriano Murillo, proposed its relocation in the open space so that the public could freely enjoy this peculiar and unusual creation. The statue was passed to the city hall that placed it on the spot of its present location which was formerly occupied by the Real Fábrica de Porcelanas de la China before its destruction during the French invasion in 1813, at the intersection of the paseo de Cuba, the paseo de Uruguay and the paseo del Duque de Fernán Nuñez in the Retiro park. The duque de Fernán Nuñez (probably Manuel Falcó y d´Adda y Valcárcel, the husband of the III Duquesa de Fernán Núñez) sponsored the monument. The architect Francisco Jareño was charged to design the pedestal, that is octagonal with figures of devils on each side gripping fishes, lizards and snakes, and placed at the center of a fountain of 10 meters diameter, itself surrounded by a parterre. The inauguration was made by the Queen consort of Spain Maria Christina of Austria in 1885. The monument is 7 meters high (the statue itself is 2.65 meters) and lies at the center of a roundabout named after the statue, that also gives its name to an entrance of the park.

While the work, turned over by a student, initially received its share of criticisms, it was mainly highly received by the critics and is now an attraction of the Spanish capital. It is renowned for its dramatic appeal, the tension in the expression and its ambiguity in treating a polemical subject that caused turmoil regarding its possible interpretation as a satanic tribute. It has the reputation to be the only prominent sculpture dedicated to the devil. It is, however, correct that it happens to stand at 666 meters above sea level. There is a polyester resin replica of Bellver's work at the Museum of the Real Academia de Bellas Artes de San Fernando in Madrid where details can be better appreciated.

References

External links 
Photos of the Fallen Angel from Wikimedia Commons.

Outdoor sculptures in Madrid
Sculptures of angels
Buen Retiro Park
Snakes in art
Demons in art
Fish in art
Lizards in art
Buildings and structures in Jerónimos neighborhood, Madrid
Fountains in Madrid
Bronze sculptures in Spain